David M. Tanenbaum is an American experimental physicist whose research involves surface science. He is the Osler-Loucks Professor in Science at Pomona College in Claremont, California.

Career 
Tanenbaum joined the Pomona College faculty in 1997. In July 2022, he was appointed the Osler-Loucks Professor in Science, an endowed chair.

References

External links
Faculty page at Pomona College

Year of birth missing (living people)
Living people
Pomona College faculty
Experimental physicists
21st-century American physicists